Plays the Music of Twin Peaks is a tribute album by American experimental band Xiu Xiu. Composed of cover versions of the music from the Twin Peaks soundtrack, it was released exclusively as a Record Store Day release on April 16, 2016, by Polyvinyl in the United States and Bella Union in Europe. It was produced by former Xiu Xiu member Jherek Bischoff and mixed by Deerhoof member Greg Saunier.

The covers were originally commissioned by Queensland Gallery of Modern Art for a 2015 exhibition, “David Lynch: Between Two Worlds”. Following the live performances at the exhibition, the band decided to record the covers in the studio. In accompaniment to the album, Xiu Xiu embarked on a Europe tour in April 2016. In the same month, the band released a shared music video for the tracks "Into the Night" and "Nightsea Wind", directed by Diego Barrera.

Critical reception

Benjamin Scheim of Pitchfork was positive in his review of the album, stating: "In evoking Lynch and Badalamenti, Xiu Xiu have made one of their most beautiful and listenable albums, one that highlights everything the band does well while shaving down the rough edges that often turn away foes and friends alike."

Track listing
All songs written and composed by Angelo Badalamenti.

Personnel
Xiu Xiu
 Jamie Stewart — vocals, guitar, synthesizers, noises, drum machine, production
 Angela Seo — piano, synthesizers, cymbals, production
 Shayna Dunkelman — vibraphone, percussion, drums, synthesizers, production, spoken word 

Technical personnel
 Jherek Bischoff — production, bass guitar, double bass
 Greg Saunier — mixing

Release history

References

External links
 

2016 albums
Xiu Xiu albums
Record Store Day releases
Polyvinyl Record Co. albums
Bella Union albums
Covers albums
Music of Twin Peaks